The Central District of Eyvan County is a district (bakhsh) in Eyvan County, Ilam Province, Iran. At the 2006 census, its population was 37,858, in 8,081 families.  The District has one city: Eyvan. The District has two rural districts (dehestan): Nabovat Rural District and Sarab Rural District.

References 

Districts of Ilam Province
Eyvan County